Swanville is an unincorporated community in Republican Township, Jefferson County, Indiana.

A post office was established at Swanville in 1847, and remained in operation until it was discontinued in 1907.

Geography

References

Unincorporated communities in Jefferson County, Indiana
Unincorporated communities in Indiana